Anagnostakis is a Greek surname. Notable people with the surname include:

 Andreas Anagnostakis (1826–1897), Greek physician 
 Manolis Anagnostakis (1925–2005), Greek poet 

Greek-language surnames